North Barrington is a village in Lake County, Illinois, United States. Per the 2020 census, the population was 3,171.

Geography

Neighborhoods
There are a few neighborhoods in North Barrington, three of which are Biltmore, Oaksbury, and Wynstone.

Education
Most of North Barrington is served by North Barrington Elementary School. It is the only public school inside the village. Barrington Middle School Station or Prairie Campus both serve the village as well and some is also served by Roslyn Road Elementary School. All of these schools feed into Barrington High School. Some of the village is also served by Seth Paine Elementary School, Lake Zurich Middle School North and Lake Zurich High School.

Demographics

2020 census

Note: the US Census treats Hispanic/Latino as an ethnic category. This table excludes Latinos from the racial categories and assigns them to a separate category. Hispanics/Latinos can be of any race.

2000 Census
As of the census of 2000, there were 2,918 people, 1,003 households, and 887 families living in the village. The racial makeup of the village was 96.50% White, 0.48% African American, 1.61% Asian, 0.03% Pacific Islander, 0.34% from other races, and 1.03% from two or more races. Hispanic or Latino of any race were 2.43% of the population.

There were 1,003 households, out of which 40.2% had children under the age of 18 living with them, 83.9% were married couples living together, 2.8% had a female householder with no husband present, and 11.5% were non-families. 9.2% of all households were made up of individuals, and 3.1% had someone living alone who was 65 years of age or older.  The average household size was 2.91 and the average family size was 3.10.

In the village, the population was spread out, with 28.6% under the age of 18, 3.8% from 18 to 24, 22.1% from 25 to 44, 36.6% from 45 to 64, and 8.8% who were 65 years of age or older.  The median age was 43 years. For every 100 females, there were 99.5 males.  For every 100 females age 18 and over, there were 98.2 males.

The median income for a household in the village was $146,251, and the median income for a family was $152,474. The per capita income for the village was $81,243.  About 2.2% of families and 2.8% of the population were below the poverty line, including 4.6% of those under age 18 and none of those age 65 or over.

Notable people
 Peter DiFronzo (1933–2020), mobster (Chicago Outfit)
 Joe Walsh (b. 1961), conservative talk radio host and former Republican U.S. Representative for Illinois' 8th congressional district (2011-2013).

References

External links
Village of North Barrington official website
Barrington Area Library

Villages in Illinois
Villages in Lake County, Illinois